Lake George is a lake in Hammond, Indiana, in the United States.

Lake George is in the far northwest corner of Indiana, part of the Chicago metropolitan area. It sits between Wolf Lake to the west and Lake Michigan to the east. Lake George has a north and south basin divided by the Lake George Trail, a  greenway. Calumet College of St. Joseph sits on the eastern shore of the lake.

Before development of the greater region, the area around Lake George was covered with wetlands, slow-moving rivers, and shallow lakes. In the 1900s, some of these areas were filled in with slag wastes from steel production and materials dredged from the Calumet River system.

Studies in the 1990s demonstrated that phragmites and other non-native invasive plants had choked out native species in the lake. The Indiana Department of Natural Resources began a project in the 2010s to counteract the invasion of invasive plants and restore the larger Grand Calumet River area as a nesting and foraging habitat for birds. The restoration involves a combination of herbicide applications to kill the invasive species followed by re-seeding with native plants.

In addition, working through the Hammond port Authority, the city has added beaches, hiking and biking trails, improved fishing and boating facilities, and other entertainment venues, in an attempt to make Hammond a tourist destination.

References 

Bodies of water of Lake County, Indiana
Hammond, Indiana